Consol may refer to:
Consol (bond), a type of perpetual bond issued by the government of the United Kingdom
 Consolidated cargo replenishment, Navy capability to refuel oilers at Sea
Consol, a consolidator who buys in bulk and sells to other agents, for example Travel Consol in a British Travel Company
Consol Energy, an American coal mining company
Consol Energy Center, the home arena of the Pittsburgh Penguins, named after the above coal mining company
A&M Consolidated High School, a four-year public high school in College Station, Texas
Consol radio navigation system, A long range radio navigation system for aircraft used 1930s-1991